The  Federal University of Uberlândia (UFU) is a Brazilian public university, located in the southwest of Minas Gerais, in Uberlândia, Brazil. The students are admitted through both annual exams, the vestibular, and the National High School Exam.

, UFU offers 55 undergraduate degrees, including a sought-after Medicine degree, Law, Economics, plus Engineering, Business, Science and Art degrees. It offers 19 doctorate programs, 38 master's degree programs, 34 diplomas and 21 medical residence programs.

History
The first colleges were established in 1960s. At August 14, 1969, the Faculty of Law (founded in 1960), Faculty of Philosophy, Science and Languages (founded in 1960), Faculty of Engineering (founded in 1961) and Faculty of Economics (founded in 1963) were united to build the University of Uberlândia (UnU) with the Brazilian Government confirmation by the decree-law  nº 762. On May 24, 1978, University of Uberlândia became the Federal University of Uberlândia by the Law N. 6532.

Rankings and reputation

At the national level, in recent years the Federal University of Uberlândia comes to be one of the twenty best public universities of Brazil. Nowadays, it is at the 13th position of the 106 national public universities.

See also 
 Brazil University Rankings
 Universities and Higher Education in Brazil

References

External links

 

Educational institutions established in 1969
Universities and colleges in Minas Gerais
1969 establishments in Brazil
Federal universities of Brazil